Attitude Reconstruction: A Blueprint for Building a Better Life is a book written by American author and psychotherapist, Jude Bijou, MA, MFT. This book has received multiple awards including 2012 Winner of ForeWord Review in both psychology and self-help, the 2012 Benjamin Franklin Award in self-help, and the 2012 Nautilus Silver Award in personal growth/psychology. Its content is widely used by individuals, couples and groups as well as within therapeutic settings by licensed professionals. Attitude Reconstruction: A Blueprint for Building a Better Life proposes that unexpressed sadness, anger, and fear are the root causes of all negative attitudes and perceived problems.

The author, daughter of pioneer behavioral child psychologist Sidney W. Bijou, blends eastern philosophy with western innovation to create a holistic system of human behavior, and systematically outlines steps to change old patterns, transform destructive attitudes, and create a meaningful life. The book and its central approach is the foundation of Bijou's workshops, communications courses, speaking engagements, videos, and trainings.

Synopsis
Bijou asserts that humans have only six emotions, existing in three opposing pairs – sadness and joy, anger and love, fear and peace. Attitude Reconstruction correlates these six emotions with predictable feelings, thoughts, communication, and actions.

The author proposes that emotions are nothing but energy, or pure physical sensations in the body; when we don't release sadness, anger, and fear from hurts and losses, we revert to predictable destructive attitudes. When not in the grip of these three emotions, the author states our attitudes embody the other three emotions—joy, love, and peace. Bijou's central methodology incorporates physically and constructively releasing emotional energy from the body through crying, stomping, or shivering in order to restore calm and clarity.

Attitude Reconstruction includes a Blueprint of the mind created by Bijou, who says there are four universal attitudes that accompany each emotion. She found the core attitudes associated with the emotions of joy, love, and peace boil down to three ultimate attitudes – honor yourself, accept other people and situations, and stay present and specific.

Attitude Reconstruction also offers worksheets and quick charts to changing challenging behaviors, as well as detailed steps for effectively communicating with others on any topic.

Reception

Attitude Reconstruction has won many awards since its publication in May 2011 and revision in November 2011. Awards include: 
2012 Winner for Benjamin Franklin Award in Self-Help
2012 Winner ForeWord Reviews in Psychology and Self Help
2012 Silver Nautilus Award in Self-Help / Personal Growth / Psychology
2011-2012 Winner Los Angeles Book Festival in How-to category
2012 Winner International Book Awards in Health: Psychology/Mental Health
2012 Winner in Personal Growth

Bijou gives radio interviews and writes articles based on Attitude Reconstruction.

Attitude Reconstruction Survey
Through the years in Jude Bijou’s psychotherapy practice, she noticed that people mostly share the same issues. Through her practice, Bijou discovered that there are 12 core attitudes that underlie all our problems, although each person has a slightly different story based on his or her particular situation, history, and basic constitution. These attitudes include examples like: feeling the need to control, being selfish, or being judgmental. The 12 attitudes and the problems they cause stem from three unexpressed emotions: sadness, anger, and fear.

Bijou designed an online survey that would help people identify which core emotion causes them the most trouble in their lives, and which attitudes were most predominant. Based on answers from over 1,000 participants, she discovered that the most dominant emotion respondents experience is fear.

The Attitude Reconstruction Survey results indicated that people mostly struggle with living in the present. More than 7 out of 10 (71.4%) participants reported that they're preoccupied with the past or the future half or more of the time. Forty nine percent say often or almost always, and 17% say they are in the past or future "almost always." This is a classic symptom of fear.

Fifty eight percent of the respondents surveyed (58.6%) said they feel a need to control half or more of the time, another common fear symptom. Fifty eight percent said they make negative judgments about themselves at least half the time.

References

American non-fiction books
Psychology books